Giovan Battista Ruoppolo (1629–1693) was a Neapolitan painter of still-lifes.

Life

He was a pupil of Paolo Porpora (1617–1673), a contemporary of Salvatore Rosa. Additional Porpora pupils who formed a school of still-life painters in Naples were Giovan Battista, Giuseppe Recco, and Ruoppolo's brother of Giuseppe Ruoppolo.

His pupils included Onofrio Loth and Aniello Ascione.  In addition, he influenced Andrea Belvedere and Giacomo Nani. The initials of Ruoppolo match those of the younger Recco, suggesting some canvas attributions are likely in error. The dark backgrounds to his still life call to memory Caravaggio's bowl of fruit and flowers. Another contemporary painter, though trained in Rome, of still lifes in Italy was Giovanna Garzoni.

Gallery

References

Sources

External links

Ruoppolo, Giovanni Battista
Ruoppolo, Giovanni Battista
17th-century Italian painters
Italian male painters
Italian Baroque painters
Italian still life painters